Emiliano Eduardo Astorga Lobos (born 21 September 1960) is a Chilean football manager and former player who played as a defender. He is the current manager of Cobreloa.

Honours

As footballer

Club
Santiago Morning
 Tercera División: 1996

As player

Individual
 El Gráfico’s Manager of the Season: 2012

References

External links
 Astorga at Football Lineups
 

1960 births
Living people
People from San Antonio, Chile
Chilean footballers
Primera B de Chile players
Chilean Primera División players
Tercera División de Chile players
San Antonio Unido footballers
Magallanes footballers
Deportes Magallanes footballers
Unión La Calera footballers
Rangers de Talca footballers
Naval de Talcahuano footballers
Deportes Melipilla footballers
Santiago Morning footballers
Association football defenders
Chilean football managers
Deportes Melipilla managers
Unión La Calera managers
Club Deportivo Palestino managers
Santiago Wanderers managers
San Marcos de Arica managers
Cobresal managers
Ñublense managers
Deportes Copiapó managers
Cobreloa managers
Rangers de Talca managers
Primera B de Chile managers
Chilean Primera División managers
People from San Antonio Province
People from Valparaíso Region